Biscuiterie Saint-Michel is a French food company based in Contres. It was founded in 1905.

Saint-Michel produces a range of biscuits, exports them to about 30 countries, and offers store brand production services. The "Galette St Michel" biscuit, which has been produced since 1905, features the surname of the founder (Grellier).

References

External links 
 Company website

Food and drink companies of France
Food and drink companies established in 1905
1905 establishments in France
Companies based in Centre-Val de Loire